Gelenoptron tentaculatum is an extinct, cnidarian-like organism represented by a single specimen and counterslab from the Burgess Shale. The holotype of G. tentaculatum was originally identified as a second specimen of the Animalia incertae sedis, Redoubtia, but established as a separate genus by Simon Conway Morris in 1993.  A reflective shield recalls the float of chondrophore hydrozoans.

References 

Hydrozoa
Burgess Shale animals
Prehistoric cnidarian genera
Monotypic cnidarian genera
Cambrian genus extinctions